The 1832 New Hampshire gubernatorial election was held on March 13, 1832.

Incumbent Democratic Governor Samuel Dinsmoor defeated National Republican nominee Ichabod Bartlett with 61.60% of the vote in a re-match of the previous year's election.

General election

Candidates
Ichabod Bartlett, National Republican, former U.S. Representative, unsuccessful candidate for Governor in 1831
Samuel Dinsmoor, Democratic, incumbent Governor

Results

Notes

References

1832
New Hampshire
Gubernatorial